Colorado is a state located in the southwestern United States.

Colorado may also refer to:

Geography

Rivers
 Colorado River in the western United States and Mexico that passes through the Grand Canyon 
 Colorado River (Texas) in Texas in the United States
 Colorado River (Argentina)

Towns/cities
 Colorado, Mitchells Plain, City of Cape Town, South Africa
 Colorado, Paraná, Brazil
 Colorado, Rio Grande do Sul, Brazil
 Colorado, Texas, US
 Colorado City, Colorado, US
 Colorado City, Texas, US
 Colorado Springs, Colorado, US
 Alto Colorado, Pichilemu, Chile

Other places
 The University of Colorado at Boulder, a public research university located in Boulder, Colorado
 Colorado County, Texas
 Colorado Desert in California
 Colorado Plateau, physiographic region in Western United States
 Colorados Archipelago, chain of isles and cays on Cuba's north-western coast
 Colorado Group, a geologic classification in the Great Plains of North America
 Los Colorados Formation, near La Rioja, Argentina
 The French Colorado, near Rustrel in Provence-Alpes-Côte d'Azur, France

Sports
 Colorado Buffaloes, sports teams from the University of Colorado
 Sports in Colorado, any sports team from Colorado
 Colorado (horse) (1923–1929), British Thoroughbred racehorse
 A nickname for Sport Club Internacional, a Brazilian football team

Transportation
 Chevrolet Colorado and Holden Colorado, pickup trucks manufactured by GM
 The USS Colorado, a number of ships built by the United States
 Colorado station, a side platformed RTD light rail station in Denver, Colorado, United States
 40th & Colorado station, a side platformed RTD commuter rail station in Denver, Colorado, United States

Arts and entertainment
 Colorado (1921 film), a silent western film directed by B. Reeves Eason
 Colorado (1940 film), an American Western film directed by Joseph Kane and starring Roy Rogers
 Colorado (game), a solitaire card game

Music
 Los Colorados, a Ukrainian polka band
 Colorado (Kabát album), 1994
 Colorado (Neil Young album), 2019
 "Colorado" (Mikolas Josef song), 2019
 "Colorado" (Sandra Reemer song), 1979
 "Colorado" (Milky Chance song), a 2021 song by Milky Chance

Other uses
 Colorado Group Limited, an Australian clothing chain
 The Colorado language, spoken in Ecuador
 Colorado Party (Paraguay), a political party in Paraguay
 Colorado Party (Uruguay), a political party in Uruguay
 Colorado Trading & Clothing, a US clothing chain based in Denver, Colorado
 Bolivian Colorados Regiment, commonly known as "Los Colorados de Bolivia", a prestigious infantry regiment of the Bolivian Army
 Colorados (kolorady), a negative term for Russian extreme patriots and militants, after the resemblance of the Colorado potato beetle's coloration to the Ribbon of Saint George

See also
 Cerro Colorado (disambiguation)